María Peláez Sánchez (born 31 March 1990) is a Spanish singer and composer, known artistically as María Peláe. She has released two albums, entitled Hipocondría y La folcrónica. She participated as a contestant in the ninth edition of Antena 3's Tu cara me suena (2021–2022), finishing third. Her music is a mix of flamenco and pop rhythms, and the words to her songs are often funny and critical of society.

Trajectory 
She was born in Málaga on 31 March 1990. At the age of 13, she was given a guitar, and at 16, she gave her first concert as a percussionist. At the age of 18, shortly before entering medical school, she gave her first concert as a soloist (guitar and voice). She felt so strongly about it that she decided to study something that would allow her to combine it with music, which led her to choose social work and, later, anthropology.

In 2016, she released her first studio album, Hipocondría, thanks to a crowdfunding campaign and with it she toured a multitude of venues in various Spanish cities, such as Café Berln in Madrid or Cochera Cabaret in Málaga. 

She has composed two songs that were finalists to represent Spain at Eurovision: "Arde", sung by Aitana (composed with Alba Reig from Sweet California) and "Nadie se salva" (with Nil Moliner and Garabato), performed by Miki Núñez and Natalia Lancuza.  From 2019, after delaying the start of her new project due to last minute changes, she began to upload to her Youtube channel a series of songs that denoted a change towards a more modern production (a change recommended by Alba Reig of Sweet California).

The first single from this new stage, released in July 2019, was En casa de herrero (talking about the music industry and the artist's own change of sound), and in September of that same year she released La niña (dealing with female homosexuality using irony and with autobiographical overtones).

La niña followed by Y quién no, No me mires así, sung with Alba Reig and whose video clip was recorded during the quarantine derived from the COVID-19 pandemic, La confesión, La quería  with Riki Rivera on guitar, Te espero en jarra with the singer Sandra Carrasco, and Mi tío Juan (in which she talks about male homosexuality with a lot of irony). Later, she released Que vengan a por mí, a more serious song she composed after "seeing a demonstration of very young people with a lot of hate in their eyes, attacking and saying very ugly things to people who were demonstrating for something nice," as she said in an interview on the Antena 3 program El Hormiguero.

Tu cara me suena 
On 23 July 2021, her official participation as a contestant in the ninth edition of Antena 3's Tu cara me suena was confirmed, alongside personalities such as Los Morancos, Lydia Bosch, Loles León, Eva Soriano, David Fernández, Rasel Abad, Nia Correia and Agoney.

She became the second finalist after her imitation of Barbara Pravi, a French singer who represented France at Eurovision. She came in third place with her imitation of Lola Flores, whom she has cited on multiple occasions as a reference, and was one of the favorites throughout the edition.

She is out as a lesbian and has used her songs and appearances on TV and in the press to bring more attention to the LGBTI community.

Discography

Studio albums 

 Hipocondría (2016)
 La folcrónica (2022)

Singles 

 En casa de herrero (2019)
 La niña (2019)
 Y quién no (2020)
 No me mires así (2020)
 La confesión (2020)
 La quería (con Riki Rivera) (2020)
 Te espero en jarra (with Sandra Carrasco)(2021)
 Mi tío Juan (2021)
 Que vengan a por mí (2021)
 Cómo están las cosas (with Nia) (2022)
 La quería (con Pastora Soler) (2022)
 Historia de vida (with Vanesa Martín) (2022)
 Cuéntale (with Las niñas) (2022)

References 

1990 births
Living people
Spanish women singer-songwriters
Spanish lesbian musicians
Spanish LGBT singers
Spanish LGBT songwriters
Lesbian singers
Lesbian songwriters
21st-century Spanish women singers
20th-century LGBT people
21st-century LGBT people